The Oracle of the Lamb is an ancient Egyptian prophetic text written on a papyrus in Demotic Egyptian and dated to the thirty-third year of the reign of the Roman Emperor Augustus (r. 27 BC – 14 AD). In it, a lamb speaks and provides prophecies to a man named Pasenhor. The lamb describes a world turned upside-down and reduced to chaos: temples are in disarray, the ruler has now become the ruled, and the Medes (i.e. referring to the Persian domination of Egypt) have come to destroy Egypt. It also mentions that the Greeks (i.e. referring to the Ptolemaic domination of Egypt) will take the White Crown (representing pharaonic Upper Egypt). The story is comparable in style, tone, and subject matter to prophetic texts of the Middle Kingdom of Egypt, such as the Prophecy of Neferti.

See also

 Demotic Chronicle
 Oracle of the Potter

Notes

References

Gozzoli, Roberto B. (2006). The Writings of History in Ancient Egypt during the First Millennium BC (ca. 1070–180 BC): Trends and Perspectives. London: Golden House Publications, printed and bound by T.J. International. .

External links
 Oracle of the Lamb : English translation by R.K. Ritner 

Egyptian papyri
Prophecy